Amt Gerswalde is an Amt ("collective municipality") in the district of Uckermark, in Brandenburg, Germany. Its seat is in Gerswalde.

The Amt Gerswalde consists of the following municipalities:
Flieth-Stegelitz
Gerswalde
Milmersdorf
Mittenwalde
Temmen-Ringenwalde

Demography

References

Gerswalde
Uckermark (district)